Friedrich Burmeister (24 March 1888, in Wittenberge – 25 July 1968, in East Berlin) was minister for post and telecommunication in the DDR.

External links
 Prignitzlexikon – Biography of Friedrich Burmeister 
 "Burmeister, Friedrich" in Wer war wer in der DDR? (Who Was Who in the GDR?), vol. 1, 4th ed., Ch. Links Verlag, Berlin 2006.  

1888 births
1968 deaths
People from Wittenberge
People from the Province of Brandenburg
German Democratic Party politicians
Christian Democratic Union (East Germany) politicians
Government ministers of East Germany
Members of the 1st Volkskammer
Members of the 2nd Volkskammer
German military personnel of World War I
Recipients of the Patriotic Order of Merit (honor clasp)
Recipients of the Banner of Labor
Recipients of the Medal of Merit of the GDR